The Elitegroup Computer Systems Headquarters is a 21-storey skyscraper office building completed in 2007 and located in Neihu District, Taipei, Taiwan. One of the most prominent landmarks in the Neihu Science Park along the bank of the Keelung River, the building serves as the corporate headquarters of the Taiwanese electronics firm Elitegroup Computer Systems.

See also 
 List of tallest buildings in Taiwan
 List of tallest buildings in Taipei
 Elitegroup Computer Systems
 Lite-On Technology Center

References

2007 establishments in Taiwan
Skyscraper office buildings in Taipei
Office buildings completed in 2007